Danny Logan (born September 30, 1997) is an American professional lacrosse player who plays as a defensive midfielder for Atlas Lacrosse Club of the Premier Lacrosse League and as a defenseman for the San Diego Seals of the National Lacrosse League.

Early life and career 
Logan was born in Columbus, Ohio to Whitney and Karen Logan. He grew up in Upper Arlington, Ohio, where he attended Upper Arlington High School, earning four varsity letters in hockey and lacrosse. In lacrosse, he was a two-time All-American and state champion, and was named Ohio Player of the Year as a senior in 2016. His family was athletic, with both grandfathers and an uncle having played football for Ohio State.

College career 
Logan played five seasons at the University of Denver as a short stick defensive midfielder, also playing on the wing for faceoffs and sparingly playing offense. He spent five years with the Pioneers, graduating 8th all-time in school history in ground balls (186), and third in caused turnovers (50). He was a two-time First Team All-Big East member, and a First Team All-American in his final season. Logan graduated with a bachelor's degree in international business and finance, and a master's degree in applied qualitative finance.

Professional career

PLL 
Logan was selected 11th overall in the 2021 PLL College Draft by Atlas Lacrosse Club. Selected 3rd in the 2nd round, he was the first Short Stick Defensive Midfield selected. He won the George Boiardi Hard Hat Award as the league's top defensive midfielder as a rookie and was voted #24 in the Players' Top 50 list after the season. He won the George Boiardi award again in 2022.

Stats:

NLL 
Logan was selected 50th overall by the San Diego Seals in the 2020 NLL Draft.

International career 
Logan was named to the US national team for the 2023 World Lacrosse Championship.

Playing style 
Logan is known for his tenacity as a defensive midfielder, with teams often avoiding dodging against him. He has been referred to as a "fifth pole" for his ability on defense, being able to shut down almost any opponent and causing many turnovers. Additionally, he plays the wing on faceoffs and is a threat to score in transition.

References

External links 
Danny Logan career lacrosse statistics via statscrew.com

Danny Logan Premier Lacrosse League bio

Living people
1997 births
American lacrosse players
Premier Lacrosse League players